Adolf Hofer (17 August 1868 in Pleinlauken, East Prussia – 3 September 1935 in Berlin) was a Prussian Junker and a Social democratic politician.

Life 
His father owned a Rittergut in Skaisgirren (Bolshakovo), East Prussia. In 1889, he joined Social Democratic Party of Germany (SPD), a rather unusual choice for landed nobility of Prussia. He owned and operate the manor until 1913 when he sold it to live as privateer on the estate of his wife in Pleinlauken. 

Since 1898, he was a candidate to the Reichstag (institution), but succeed only in getting elected to the  Preußischer Landtag. He was expelled from the SPD fraction in 1917 due to his proximity to the rival USPD for which he became a leading member. Along with Otto Braun (SPD), Hofer (for USPD) was until 4 January 1919 director of the Agricultural Ministry in the Prussian Rat der Volksbeauftragten. 

In 1922 Hofer returned to SPD. From 1923 onwards he was Landrat of Kreis Fischhausen in Ostpreußen and since 1926 member of the Provinziallandtag. He retired in 1931.

Work 
 Sozialismus und Landwirtschaft. Berlin 1921

External links 
Wilhelm Heinz Schröder: Sozialdemokratische Parlamentarier in den deutschen Reichs- und Landtagen 1867-1933 (search required)

1868 births
1935 deaths
Members of the Prussian House of Representatives
Social Democratic Party of Germany politicians
People from the Province of Prussia